Georg Henrich (9 September 1878 – 30 March 1934) was a German stage and film actor.

Selected filmography
 The Fountain of Madness (1921)
 The Way to the Light (1923)
 Girls You Don't Marry (1924)
 The Shot in the Pavilion (1925)
 Women Who Fall by the Wayside (1925)
 Behind Monastery Walls (1928)
 Love on Skis (1928)
 Waterloo (1929)
 When the White Lilacs Bloom Again (1929)
 Brother Bernhard (1929)
 A Man with Heart (1932)
 Cruiser Emden (1932)
 The Tunnel (1933)
 Must We Get Divorced? (1933)

References

Bibliography
 Grange, William. Cultural Chronicle of the Weimar Republic. Scarecrow Press, 2008.

External links

1878 births
1934 deaths
German male stage actors
German male film actors
Actors from Mainz